The Grampus-class submarines were a group of minelaying submarines built for the Royal Navy  in the late 1930s. These boats are sometimes referred to as the Porpoise class from the single prototype, HMS Porpoise built in 1932. Five boats to a modified design were built between 1936 and 1938. The ships were all named after marine mammals.

Design
The naval mines were stored in a special "gallery" with a conveyor belt built into the outer casing as pioneered by the converted M-class submarine . These boats were of a saddle tank type.

Service
Boats of this class were used extensively in the Mediterranean, particularly as part of the supply effort to the besieged island of Malta in a service nicknamed the "magic carpet".

Only one, survived the war.

Boats in class

References

 Conway's All the World's Fighting Ships 1922-1946
 - page from U-boat.net
 page from rnsubs.co.uk

 
Minelayers of the Royal Navy
Submarine classes